Sir Cuthbert Gordon Greenidge  (born 1 May 1951) is a Barbadian, former first-class cricketer, who represented the West Indies in Test and One-day Cricket for 17 years. Greenidge is regarded worldwide as one of the greatest and most destructive opening batsmen in cricket history. In 2009, Greenidge was inducted into the ICC Cricket Hall of Fame.

Early life 
Born Cuthbert Gordon Lavine in St. Peter, Barbados, he was raised by his mother. At the ages of 8 and 14, he was raised by his grandmother after his mother moved to London (England) to find work. His mother married, and Gordon moved to 'Reading' (England) as a 14-year-old to live with her and his stepfather. He described racism frequently while attending school in Reading and left school without any qualifications. He played cricket for his school, and the team won the Reading Schools Cricket League. He was selected to play for the Berkshire Bantams in 1967 and scored 135* runs in their game against Wiltshire. This attracted the attention of Hampshire and Warwickshire, who offered Greenidge a trial.

Domestic career
Greenidge began his career in English county cricket with Hampshire in the English County Championship. He joined in April 1968 as a 17 year old playing for the second eleven and was also given responsibilities such as painting the seating at the stadium. His fielding at this stage "left much to be desired". Nearly losing his contract, Greenidge applied himself over the winter and in 1970 scored 841 runs in 15 second eleven matches and eventually broke into the Hampshire first eleven team averaging 35 in seven matches with 4 scores over fifty.

He batted as an opener with Barry Richards for Hampshire, first playing together in August 1970. Gordon Greenidge said of the experience of playing alongside Barry Richards was "something I shall never forget. It was an education and an inspiration. If, at the end of my career, people talk of Richards and Greenidge in the same breath, then I for one will not mind it in the least".  During his first-class career, he scored a total of 37,000 runs with 92 centuries.

In 1974, Greenidge scored his highest first class score of 273 not out at Eastbourne for Derrick Robin's XI against the Pakistani side who were touring England that year. He said that he had drunk too much lager the night before and had woken up with "the most dreadful hangover". He did not recollect the innings saying "I middled every ball and yet hardly saw one delivery clearly...I can't remember a single shot but when I returned to the pavilion rather later than I had anticipated, I discovered I had made 273 not out". He hit 13 sixes and 31 fours in the innings.

In 1984, Greenidge achieved the highest batting average of any player during the English season. In his 16 innings, he scored 1069 runs at an average of 82.23.

Greenidge received the  ‘Hampshire Cricket Society Player of the Year’ in 1986 and played his final season for Hampshire in 1987.

Greenidge  holds the record for the highest score for Hampshire in a 60 over game of 177 against Glamorgan and the highest score in a 40 over game for Hampshire of 172 against Surrey.

International career
Gordon Greenidge was eligible to play for England but he opted to play for the West Indies. Greenidge played as an opening batsman and he began his Test career in 1974 against India at M. Chinnaswamy Stadium, Bangalore, scoring 93 and 107 on debut.

Greenidge made his ODI debut against Pakistan in the 1975 Cricket World Cup. The 1975 Cricket World Cup was a quiet tournament for Greenidge. His only innings of note was 55 in the semi-final against New Zealand.  It took four more years to score an ODI century when he made 106 not out against India at Edgbaston Cricket Ground, Birmingham. His highest score of 133 was made against the same team shortly after the 1983 Cricket World Cup. All but two of his ODI centuries were match-winning ones.

The 1975-76 West Indian tour of Australia was considered by Greenidge as "personal nightmare so painful that I have spent my life since trying to erase it from my memory". Greenidge scored 11 runs in four test innings and the West Indies lost the series 5–1.  He resolved, after that tour, to become "such a consistently high scorer that I could not be ignored". He said that “I knew from that point I had to tighten my game”.

In the 1976 West Indian tour of England, Greenidge scored over a 1000 runs for the West Indies. This included his 134 out of the West Indian total of 211 in the first innings and a further century in the second innings of the Old Trafford test, 84 runs out of the West Indian total of 182 in the first innings of the test at Lord's and a century in the test match at Leeds. He scored a further five centuries for the West Indies on tour with one each against Somerset, Leicestershire, Middlesex, Glamorgan and Nottinghamshire.  In 1977, Wisden named Gordon Greenidge the Cricketer of the Year.

Gordon Greenidge and Desmond Haynes formed a prolific opening partnership, first playing a test match together in 1978. The pair made 6,482 runs while batting together in partnerships, the third highest total for a batting partnership in Test cricket history as of 2019. Desmond Haynes said of Greenidge: "Our opening partnership broke records, but Gordon was the better player. His technique was super, especially against spin". They enjoyed 16 century opening partnerships in test matches. They also had success in one day cricket with their batting partnerships yielding 5,150 runs at an average of 52.55.

Between 1977 and 1979 Greenidge joined the West Indies team to play in the WSC Super tests. He was the fifth highest run scorer in this with a total of 754 runs in 13 matches.

Greenidge had a prolific 1979 Cricket World Cup scoring 253 runs (the most in the tournament) at an average of 84 with a century against India and 73 runs in the semi final.

During the 5th test of the 1983 series between West Indies and India, Greenidge became the first and,  only, person in test history to be retired not out when not injured. He had to leave the match in Antigua while on 154 to visit his gravely ill daughter, who died two days later, in Barbados.

Greenidge continued scoring runs at the 1983 Cricket World Cup with a total of scoring 250 runs at an average of 41 including a century against Zimbabwe. The World Cup final, the third that Greenidge had played in, was a disappointment as Greenidge was bowled out for 1 run in the loss to India.

Greenidge scored two double centuries against England in the 1984 summer Test series. This series was dubbed the "Blackwash" because West Indies won by a margin of 5–0. Greenidge scored 214 not out in the second innings of the second Test at Lord's in June 1984 and followed up with 223 in the fourth Test at Old Trafford in late July.

The 214* was achieved on the fifth and last day of the match as West Indies successfully chased 342 for victory. It remains the highest run chase at Lords. The innings was described as "a sadistic uncle enjoying an afternoon's beach cricket against his nieces and nephews back home in Barbados". Desmond Haynes said of it: "We were chasing 342 on the final day, and everyone thought we'd bat out time, but Gordon had a different idea. He thought that, if he got going, he could get the runs in an afternoon, and he did". Chris Broad said “As far as the result was concerned it was a disaster; we lost a game we should have won… Things did not go too badly for the first four days, just on the last day things fell apart — or rather Greenidge pulled a big one out the bag. That innings taught me a bit about being a Test match opener.”

In New Zealand in 1987, Greenidge scored his third test double century in Auckland to lead the West Indies to a 10 wicket victory. He hit seven sixes and twenty fours in his innings batting for almost 2 full days. it was considered "a triumph of technique and temperament".

Greenidge became the first player in One Day International (ODI) history to score a century in his 100th ODI when he scored 102* against Pakistan in 1988. In that game he achieved that milestone as captain, with his century eventually going in vain as West Indies lost that match.

Gordon Greenidge played in his 100th test match in 1990. This was the fifth test match against England at St Johns Cricket Ground in Antigua. Gordon Greenidge and Desmond Haynes opened the batting with Greenidge scoring 149 before being run out and Haynes scoring 167 runs. They had an opening partnership of 298 runs. The West Indies won the match by an innings and 32 runs.

His final double century was scored at home in Barbados when the West Indies played Australia in 1991. Leading into the game, Greenidge had been going through a lean patch, having scored one fifty in the last 24 innings. He hit an impressive 226 allowing the West Indies to beat Australia by 343 runs.

In total, Greenidge played in 108 Test matches, scoring 7,558 runs with 19 centuries, and in 128 ODIs, including the 1975 and 1983 World Cup Finals, scoring 5,134 runs and 11 centuries.   He picked up the ‘Man of the Match’ award 20 times in ODIs and a further six times in test matches. He later made an appearance for Scotland.

Coaching
Gordon Greenidge decided to pursue a coaching career and became the coach of the Bangladeshi national cricket team in 1996. He was appointed the head coach of the Bangladesh national cricket team in 1997. Under his guidance, the Bangladesh men's cricket team won the 1997 ICC Trophy beating 22 other nations. This also ensured the qualification of Bangladesh to the 1999 ICC Cricket World Cup, which was the first ever appearance in top-level cricket. Participating in their very first cricket world cup changed Bangladesh cricket forever and lead to Test cricket status for the Bangladesh national cricket team in 2000, which meant Bangladesh was promoted to full ICC member status and began playing Test cricket matches. Soon after winning the 1997 ICC Trophy, Gordon Greenidge was conferred honorary citizenship of Bangladesh for these outstanding achievements of winning the 1997 ICC Trophy and simultaneously qualifying for the cricket world cup.  Greenidge is currently on the West Indies selection committee for Test matches, along with Sir Viv Richards.

Personal life
Greenidge's son Carl is a former cricketer who coaches at Bancroft's School with John Lever. Carl also portrayed his father in the 2021 Indian film 83 which depicts the events of the 1983 Cricket World Cup. He was claimed to be the Grandfather of Reiss Greenidge, who is a footballer, however this was subsequently reported to be untrue.

He received Bangladeshi citizenship for his contribution as a coach of the Bangladesh National Cricket Team.  A primary school was named after him in 1993. The Gordon Greenidge Primary School is located in Barbados and was built to amalgamate the St. Boniface Primary School and the Black Bess Primary Schools.

He was appointed Knight Commander of the Order of St Michael and St George (KCMG) in the 2020 New Year Honours.

International cricket centuries

Described by ESPNcricinfo as "Brooding and massively destructive", he was among the 55 initial inductees of the ICC Cricket Hall of Fame in 2009. 

Greenidge made his Test debut on 22 November 1974 against India at the Karnataka State Cricket Association Stadium, Bangalore, scoring a century. His 214 not out against England in 1984 remains the fifth-highest individual total in the fourth innings of a Test match as of August 2015. His highest score of 226—his final century—was made against Australia in April 1991. Three of his four double-centuries feature in the Wisden's top 100 batting performances of all-time in a 2002 release. Greenidge holds the record for most centuries scored at Old Trafford. He was most prolific against England, accruing seven centuries.

Key
 *  Remained not out
   Man of the match
   Captain of West Indies in that match

Test cricket centuries

One Day International centuries

See also 
 List of centuries scored on Test cricket debut

References

External links 
 

Barbadian knights
Cricketers who made a century on Test debut
Barbados cricketers
Hampshire cricketers
Scotland cricketers
West Indies One Day International cricketers
West Indies Test cricketers
Barbadian cricketers
West Indies Test cricket captains
West Indian cricketers of 1970–71 to 1999–2000
Wisden Cricketers of the Year
World Series Cricket players
Cricketers at the 1975 Cricket World Cup
Cricketers at the 1979 Cricket World Cup
Cricketers at the 1983 Cricket World Cup
1951 births
Living people
West Indies cricket team selectors
Coaches of the Bangladesh national cricket team
Marylebone Cricket Club cricketers
Barbadian cricket coaches
Caribbean Premier League coaches
M Parkinson's World XI cricketers
D. H. Robins' XI cricketers
Barbadian appointees to the Order of St Michael and St George
Barbadian appointees to the Order of the British Empire
Cricket players and officials awarded knighthoods